Alfred D. Crimi, also known as Alfredo Crimi, (San Fratello, Italy 1900–New York City 1994), was an Italian-American painter.

Crimi was born in San Fratello, Sicily, on December 1, 1900. He emigrated to the United States in 1910 and became a US citizen in 1924. He attended the National Academy of Design in New York from 1916 to 1924, and the Beaux-Arts Institute of Design in New York from 1920 to 1921. In 1929, he went to Italy to study fresco and encaustic painting.

During World War II, Crimi went to work for Sperry Gyroscope making drawings of weapons and instruments for military training manuals.

After the war, Crimi worked as a painter and watercolorist. His style evolved into abstractionism, including his painting "Metropolis", which "uses rectangular and abstract geometrical forms to represent a modern city." He held numerous shows and was credited with having nine solo shows by 1963 when Francis Quirk organized an exhibit at Lehigh University.

Crimi painted a number of murals. Notably, he was hired by the Federal Art Project of the Works Progress Administration (WPA) for the Harlem Hospitals murals project. He also worked for the Public Works of Art Project in Key West, Florida.

Significant murals include:
 Hampshire County Courthouse mural, Northampton, Massachusetts (1940)
 Harlem Hospital, New York NY (1940)
 Post Office Mural, Wayne, Pennsylvania (1941)
 Clinton Federal Building, Washington DC (1937)

Awards and exhibitions

 1923 Louis Comfort Tiffany Foundation Fellowship
1931 Portland Museum, Oregon
1932 De Young Museum, San Francisco
1956 Emily Lowe Prize
1962 Holyoke Museum
 1963 Lehigh University Art Galleries
 1966 Fordham University
 1971 Ringwood Manor Museum
 Ulrich Museum, Wichita State University

Collections 

 Butler Museum of American Art,  Youngstown, Ohio
Brush Art Gallery, St. Lawrence University
Chrysler Museum, Norfolk, Virginia
Columbia Museum, South Carolina
Evansvilee Museum of Arts and Science, Evansville, Indiana
Forbes Library Collection, Northhampton, Massachusetts
Holyoke Museum, Massachusetts
Museum of the City of New York
Magoichire Chatani - Pres Yamatene International Inc., Tokyo, Japan
Museum of Fine Arts, Springfield, Massachusetts
Wisteriahurst Museum 
 Ulrich Museum, Wichita State University
 Portland Museum of Art, Portland, Oregon
Rose Art Museum, Brandeis University, Waltham, Massachusetts
Slater Memorial Museum, Norwich Academy, Norwich, Connecticut
Smithsonian American Art Museum
Springfield Art Museum, Springfield, Missouri
University of Syracuse 
University of Maryland
Wichita State University Museum, Kansas
Whitney Museum of American Art

References

External links
 Alfred D. Crimi papers (1924–1993)
 
 Nautilus, watercolor by Alfred D. Crimi (1947)

1900 births
1994 deaths
20th-century American painters
Italian emigrants to the United States
Federal Art Project artists
People from San Fratello